(The) Good Neighbour or (The) Good Neighbor may refer to:

 Good Neighbor (2001 film), a 2001 film
 Good Neighbor (2020 film), a 2020 film
 The Good Neighbour (newspaper)
 The Good Neighbour (film), 2011 German film directed by Stephan Rick, originally titled Unter Nachbarn
 The Good Neighbor (film), 2016 film
 a slogan for WCCO (AM), a radio station located in Minneapolis, Minnesota, USA

See also 
 Good Neighbours (disambiguation)
 
 
 Good Neighbor policy (disambiguation)